Nathaniel M. Griggs (died June 5, 1919) was a state legislator in Virginia. He served in the Virginia House of Delegates from 1883 to 1884 and in the Senate of Virginia from 1887 to 1890 He moved to Washington D.C. and worked at the Bureau of Printing and Engraving and after a Democrat became president worked at various other jobs. He is buried at the Odd Fellows Cemetery (Farmville, Virginia) in Farmville, Virginia.

See also
African-American officeholders during and following the Reconstruction era

References

1919 deaths
Republican Party members of the Virginia House of Delegates
Republican Party Virginia state senators
People from Farmville, Virginia
1857 births
African-American politicians during the Reconstruction Era
20th-century African-American people